Egon Bondy, born Zbyněk Fišer (20 January 1930 in Prague – 9 April 2007 in Bratislava), was a Czech philosopher, writer, and poet, one of the leading personalities of the Prague underground.

In the late 1940s, Bondy was active in a surrealistic group. From 1957 to 1961, he studied philosophy and psychology at Charles University in Prague. From the 1960s he was considered to be one of the main figures of the Prague underground, particularly once his texts were set to music by The Plastic People of the Universe in the 1970s. His non-conformism brought him into conflict with the totalitarian communist regime in Czechoslovakia. His works were circulated only as samizdat.

Bondy was always interested in the study of Karl Marx and in the criticism of both contemporary capitalism and state socialism. His philosophical work concerns ontological and related ethical problems. He attempts to show the relevance of ontology without any substance or grounding.

Bondy's work is very distinctive. He was a close friend of Bohumil Hrabal, another Prague writer, and is one of the most influential Czech intellectuals of the 20th century.

In the 1990s Bondy moved from Prague to Bratislava, Slovakia.

The scope of his works is exceptionally broad: he published about thirty books of poetry, ranging from epic poems in early 1950s to meditative philosophical works in the 1980s. He also published about twenty novels, including Invalidní sourozenci, most of them dealing with the topic of a society or an individual in crisis, or a crisis in the relationship between an individual and his or her community. Despite the deep, existential background of his work, the texts are fresh and entertaining. He himself most valued his philosophical works. He published a history of philosophy. However, this work is criticized by authorities within the field for its subjective deformation of the topic.

Zbyněk Fišer first took on the name Egon Bondy in 1949 when preparing a surrealistic anthology whose authors all adopted Jewish pseudonyms. Bondy had been the name of a number of prominent Prague Jews (in addition to being the name of a character in Karel Čapek's classic War with the Newts).

See also

 List of Czech writers

References

External links
We are again at the very beginning - An interview with Egon Bondy published in the Slovak weekly Slovo and daily Blisty in 2003
 Obituary in the New York Times by Douglas Martin, published 15 April 2007
 Obituary in The Independent (UK) by Marcus Williamson, published 17 April 2007
 Obituary in The Times (UK), published 18 April 2007
 Obituary in The Guardian (UK) by Ken Hunt, published 20 April 2007

1930 births
2007 deaths
Czech philosophers
Czech male poets
Czech male dramatists and playwrights
Marxist theorists
Marxist humanists
Charles University alumni
20th-century Czech philosophers
People of the Velvet Revolution
StB
20th-century Czech poets
20th-century Czech dramatists and playwrights